Elections to Ipswich Borough Council took place on 5 May 2016. This was on the same day as other local elections.

Results Summary

Ward Results
These are the results for all 16 wards.

Alexandra

Bixley

Bridge

Castle Hill

Gainsborough

Gipping

Holywells

Priory Heath

Rushmere

Sprites

St. John's

St. Margaret's

Stoke Park

Westgate

Whitehouse

Whitton

References

2016 English local elections
2016
2010s in Suffolk